Milk & Honey was a cocktail bar originally founded in New York City on 31 December 1999, with another location in Soho, London, founded by Sasha Petraske. The New York location was first located on the Lower East Side and later moved to the Flatiron District. The Lower East Side location became Attaboy, run by Petraske's proteges, when Milk & Honey relocated.

The London branch was operated as a private members' club, although non-members could visit before 11 pm with a prior reservation. In September 2020 Milk & Honey London closed permanently due to the coronavirus pandemic.

The New York bar started the global speakeasy trend at its opening and helped lead the craft cocktail movement.

House rules 
The club operated a set of "House rules", which were:

No name-dropping, no star fucking.
No hooting, hollering, shouting or other loud behaviour.
No fighting, play fighting, no talking about fighting.
Gentlemen will remove their hats. Hooks are provided.
Gentlemen will not introduce themselves to ladies. Ladies, feel free to start a conversation or ask the bartender to introduce you. If a man you don't know speaks to you, please lift your chin slightly and ignore him.
Do not linger outside the front door.
Do not bring anyone unless you would leave that person alone in your home. You are responsible for the behaviour of your guests.
Exit the bar briskly and silently. People are trying to sleep across the street. Please make all your travel plans and say all farewells before leaving the bar.

See also
 The World's 50 Best Bars

References

Bibliography

External links 
 

Nightclubs in London
Defunct drinking establishments in Manhattan